Club de Fútbol Lobos de la Benemérita Universidad Autónoma de Puebla Premier were a Mexican football club based in Puebla, Mexico. The club represented the Autonomous University of Puebla. The clubs was affiliated with Lobos BUAP and plays in the Liga Premier.

Players

Current squad

External links
Lobos Prepa

Footnotes

Football clubs in Puebla
Association football clubs established in 1999
Sport in Puebla (city)
1999 establishments in Mexico
Liga Premier de México